Beaver Creek State Wildlife Area is a tract of protected land located in central Colorado, near the town of Penrose. It covers 2,228 acres,  encompassing habitats ranging from desert to conifer forests and meadows., 
,

References

Protected areas of Fremont County, Colorado
Protected areas of Colorado
Wildlife management areas of Colorado